Sjøåsen is a village in the municipality of Namsos in Trøndelag county, Norway. It is located at the mouth of the river Årgårdselva at the end of the Løgnin arm of the Namsenfjorden. It is located along Norwegian County Road 17 at the intersection with Norwegian County Road 766 which goes north to the neighboring municipalities of Flatanger and Osen.

References

Villages in Trøndelag
Namsos